Mir Alam Tank is a reservoir in Hyderabad, Telangana, India. It is located to the south of Musi river. It was the primary source of drinking water to Hyderabad before Osman Sagar and Himayat Sagar were built. It is connected to National Highway7 near Palm Valley (Tadbun).

History
The tank is named after Mir Alam Bahadur, then Prime Minister of Hyderabad State (1804 - 1808), during the reign of Asaf Jah III, the third Nizam of Hyderabad state. Mir Alam laid the foundation for the tank on 20 July 1804 and it was completed in about two years on 8 June 1806.

Facilities
Nehru Zoological Park lies adjacent to the tank and Telangana Tourism operates boats on the lake, for which one has to enter through the zoo.

Transport
Mir Alam Tank is serviced by Rajendranagar bus depot, Falaknuma bus depot among others. Bus Route No. 7Z, 49 from secunderabad Railway station, 94, 95 from KOTHI, 74, 73, 251 from Afzal Gunj and are available every 10 minutes. The nearest Hyderabad Multi-Modal Transport System station is situated at Shivrampally.

Mir Alam Park 
A park is made on the nearshore Mir Alam tank, a water body under the leadership of Harichandana Dasari IAS Addl. Commissioner GHMC. The park is constructed using the Deccani theme. Qutab Shahi, style painting is on the walls and  painting are in 3D. There is a science park and other amenities too & This park is constructed upon FTL of MirAlam by Land filling which is totally illegal & against law.

See also

Mir Alam

References

External links
The Hindu feature

Reservoirs in Telangana
Lakes of Hyderabad, India
Neighbourhoods in Hyderabad, India